Gilbert Koomson (born 9 September 1994) is a Ghanaian professional footballer who plays as a forward or winger for Eliteserien club Sandefjord.

Club career
Koomson was born in Accra, Ghana. He played for BEC Tero Sasana in the Thai FA Youth Cup and also being call to Ghana national under-17 team.

Previously, he spent time in the Ajax Accra F.C. in Ghana. Stoke City called him to go on trial but he had a problem with a visa and thus was unable to earn a work permit. He came to Thailand to improve his career of professional footballer under the guidance and recommendation from BEC Tero Sasana Technical Director Peter Butler, (Ex West Ham United) who was coaching Koomson while he was guest coaching at the Manchester City academy in Accra Ghana.

Koomson went to European football when signing for Sogndal in Norway. After two seasons at Sogndal, Koomson signed for Brann ahead of the 2018 season.

International career
Koomson was called up to the senior Ghana side for a 2018 World Cup qualifier against Uganda in October 2016. In 2016, Koomson debuted for Ghana against South Africa.

Career statistics

Honours
Bodø/Glimt
Eliteserien: 2021

Individual
Eliteserien Top assist provider: 2016

References

External links
 profile at goal.com
 

1994 births
Living people
Footballers from Accra
Ghanaian footballers
Association football forwards
Association football wingers
Ghana international footballers
Gilbert Koomson
Gilbert Koomson
Sogndal Fotball players
SK Brann players
Kasımpaşa S.K. footballers
FK Bodø/Glimt players
Gilbert Koomson
Eliteserien players
Süper Lig players
Ghanaian expatriate footballers
Ghanaian expatriate sportspeople in Thailand
Expatriate footballers in Thailand
Ghanaian expatriate sportspeople in Norway
Expatriate footballers in Norway
Ghanaian expatriate sportspeople in Turkey
Expatriate footballers in Turkey